The Rock Hill Printing and Finish Company, also known locally as The Bleachery is a historic textile processing facility at 400 West White Street in downtown Rock Hill, South Carolina.  The complex consists of six buildings dating as far back as 1925, as well as a reservoir, and employed nearly 5,000 workers at its height in 1965.

The complex was listed on the National Register of Historic Places in 2008.  It includes the previously-listed Bleachery Water Treatment Plant.

See also
National Register of Historic Places listings in Rock Hill, South Carolina

References

Industrial buildings and structures on the National Register of Historic Places in South Carolina
Industrial buildings completed in 1925
Buildings and structures in Rock Hill, South Carolina
National Register of Historic Places in Rock Hill, South Carolina
Bleaches
Textile companies of the United States